The 2013 Copa Argentina Final was the 223rd and final match of the 2012–13 Copa Argentina. It was played on October 16, 2013 at the Estadio del Bicentenario de Catamarca between San Lorenzo and Arsenal. Arsenal won the match 3–0.

As champion, Arsenal qualified for the 2013 Supercopa Argentina and the 2014 Copa Libertadores.

Qualified teams

Road to the final

Match details

Statistics

References

2012–13 in Argentine football
2013
2012–13 domestic association football cups
A
A